The Chemins de Fer du Nord was one of the five main constituents of the SNCF at its creation in 1938.

Jules Petiet (1848–1871)
Jules Petiet was made the Chief of Works in 1845, and Locomotive Engineer in 1848, a post he held until his death in January 1871.

Édouard Delebecque (1871–1888)
Édouard Delebecque renumbered the locomotive stock in 1872 with a scheme that lasted until the Nord was nationalised in 1938. He also discontinued the naming of locomotives from 1873.

Gaston du Bousquet (1890–1910)

Georges Asselin (1910–1918)

Louis Breville (1918–1928)

Georges Collin (1928–1931)

Jean Lancrenon (1931–1938)

Preserved locomotives

References 

 

 
Nord
Nord
Nord locomotives